Gökçe is a common unisex Turkish given name. In Turkish “Gökçe" means sky blue, brave, flamboyant person.

People

Given name
 Gökçe (singer) (born 1979), full name Gökçe Dinçer, Turkish pop singer
 Gökçe Özgü, Turkish rugby player in the Turkey national rugby union team
 Gökçe Uzuner, Turkish actress appearing in Dadı
 Gökçe Yanardağ, Turkish supermodel who participated in Miss Turkey
 Gökçe Akyıldız, Turkish actress who played in Kırgın Çiçekler
 Gökçe Ellialtıoğlu, Turkish actress

Fictional characters
Gökçe Hatun, character in Diriliş: Ertuğrul

Surname
 Sariye Gökçe (born 1979), Turkish basketball player

See also
 Gökçe (disambiguation)

Turkish feminine given names
Turkish-language surnames